Ludovic Raab (born 2 October 1899, date of death unknown) was a Romanian footballer who played as a striker.

International career
Ludovic Raab played one game for Romania on 6 May 1928 under coach Constantin Rădulescu in a friendly against Yugoslavia which ended with a 3–1 loss.

References

External links
 

1899 births
Year of death missing
Romanian footballers
Romania international footballers
Place of birth missing
Association football forwards
CA Timișoara players